Nanutarra is a locality in Western Australia adjacent to where the Ashburton river is crossed by the North West Coastal Highway. It is also close to the turn-off for State Route 136 to Paraburdoo and Tom Price.

Etymology
The name is related to the locality, the pastoral lease Nanutarra Station, the bridge over the Ashburton river, the mine and the roadhouse.

Due to its isolation from other localities, it is a reference point to issues along the North West Coastal Highway from some distance in either direction.

Geography

Climate
Nanutarra has a hot arid climate (Köppen BWh) with sweltering summers, very warm winters and extremely erratic rainfall. Tropical cyclones can smash into the town and may produce more than the average annual rainfall in a single storm; but in the absence of cyclones or winter cloudbands long periods may pass without any rainfall at all.

See also
List of roadhouses in Western Australia

References

Shire of Ashburton
Roadhouses in Western Australia